Rosie Ah Wong is a former association football player who represented New Zealand at international level.

Ah Wong made her Football Ferns début in a 2–2 draw with Australia on 6 September 1979, and finished her international career with eight caps and one goal to her credit.

References

Year of birth missing (living people)
Living people
New Zealand women's association footballers
New Zealand women's international footballers
Women's association footballers not categorized by position